Echinochloa polystachya, the German grass, is a species of grass (family Poaceae), native to the New World Tropics and Subtropics, from Texas and Florida down to Argentina. It is a useful fodder for water buffaloes, and to a lesser extent, cattle.

References

polystachya
Flora of Texas
Flora of Louisiana
Flora of Florida
Flora of Mexico
Flora of Central America
Flora of the Caribbean
Flora of northern South America
Flora of Colombia
Flora of Ecuador
Flora of Peru
Flora of Brazil
Flora of Paraguay
Flora of Uruguay
Flora of Northeast Argentina
Plants described in 1920
Flora without expected TNC conservation status